The 2014 Challenge Cup (also known as the Tetley's Challenge Cup for sponsorship reasons) was the 113th staging of the rugby league tournament.

The defending champions Wigan Warriors were knocked out in the quarter finals 4 - 16 at home to the Castleford Tigers, who went on to make the final, but lost 10 - 23 to the Leeds Rhinos.

First round
The draw for the first round of the 2014 Challenge Cup was held on 8 January 2014 and broadcast live from the studios of BBC Radio Humberside by current Hull F.C. prop forward Chris Green and former player Shaun Briscoe.

The first round took place on the weekend of 1 and 2 February 2014, although three fixtures did not take place until the following Saturday - 8 February 2014.

Second round
The draw for the second round took place on 6 February 2014 and was drawn by former Wigan Warriors player Kris Radlinski and the owner of Salford Red Devils, Marwan Koukash.

Third round
The draw for the third round took place on 24 February 2014 and was made at the University of Gloucestershire's Park Campus in Cheltenham by the university's pro vice-chancellor Maxine Melling and Kevan Blackadder, the editor of the Gloucestershire Echo.

The third-round fixtures were drawn from two pools. Pool A comprised the 14 Championship teams plus four Championship 1 teams drawn at random.  From this pool two teams were drawn and awarded a bye into the fourth round, the two teams drawn were Featherstone Rovers and London Skolars.  The need to award byes came from the decision by the French teams invited into the competition to withdraw at a late stage.

The remaining five Championship 1 sides and the 11 winners of second-round matches formed Pool B.  All the third round fixtures comprised a team from Pool A vs a team from Pool B.  The team with home advantage was also determined randomly for each fixture.

Fourth round
The draw for the fourth round took take place at 3:45 pm on 18 March 2014 from Quay House, MediaCityUK, and was broadcast live on BBC Radio 5 Live Sports Extra, BBC Radio Manchester, BBC Radio Leeds and BBC Radio Humberside. The fourth round saw the entry of the 14 First Utility Super League clubs, including holders Wigan Warriors, who joined the 16 winners of the third-round ties along with Featherstone Rovers and London Skolars, who received byes in the third round.

The home teams were drawn by the Mayor of Wigan, Councillor Billy Rotherham; the away teams by David Barker, representing sponsors Tetley's.

The fourth round of the Tetley's Challenge Cup was played over April 3–6.

Fifth round
The fifth round draw took place live on BBC TV after the end of the 4th round match between Huddersfield Giants and St Helens. Home teams were drawn by Alex Murphy and away teams by Garry Schofield.  Fixtures were played over the weekend of 26–27 April 2014. BBC TV broadcast the game between Leeds Rhinos and St Helens on Saturday 26 April.

Quarter-finals
The draw for the Quarter finals was held on Monday 28 April 2014 at 18:30 and televised on the BBC News channel. The home teams were drawn by Jason Robinson and the away teams by Paul Sculthorpe. Ties were played between June 5–8, 2014.

Semifinals
The draw for the semifinals was held on Sunday 8 June 2014 following the Bradford/Warrington game, which was televised on BBC Two.  The draw was conducted by Eorl Crabtree and Brian Noble. The ties were played on the weekend of 9–10 August 2014.

Final

The final of the 2014 Challenge Cup took place on 23 August 2014 at Wembley Stadium with the match kicking off at 15:00 BST. The match was shown live on BBC One.  Leeds Rhinos won the game 23–10.

Teams
Castleford Tigers: Luke Dorn; Kirk Dixon, Jake Webster, Michael Shenton, Justin Carney; Marc Sneyd, Liam Finn; Andy Lynch, Daryl Clark, Craig Huby, Oliver Holmes, Weller Hauraki, Nathan Massey.
Substitutes: Frankie Mariano, Scott Wheeldon, Jamie Ellis, Lee Jewitt.

Leeds Rhinos: Zak Hardaker; Tom Briscoe, Kallum Watkins, Joel Moon, Ryan Hall; Kevin Sinfield, Danny McGuire; Kylie Leuluai, Rob Burrow, Jamie Peacock, Brett Delaney, Carl Ablett, Jamie Jones-Buchanan.
Substitutes: Paul Aiton, Ryan Bailey, Ian Kirke, Liam Sutcliffe.

UK Broadcasting rights
The tournament was jointly televised by the BBC and Sky Sports on the third of their five-year contracts. The BBC screened, live, one match from each of the fourth and fifth rounds, two from the quarter-finals, both semi-finals and the final. Sky screened the two quarter-final games not being shown by the BBC.

Sky Sports televised the other two quarter final matches live. The first was Widnes Vikings and Keighley Cougars and the second was Leeds Rhinos and Leigh Centurions

External links
 Challenge Cup official website

References

Challenge Cup
Challenge Cup
Challenge Cup
2014 in French rugby league
2014 in Welsh rugby league
2014 in Scottish sport